Kosikhinsky District is an administrative and municipal district (raion), one of the fifty-nine in Altai Krai, Russia. It is located in the northeast of the krai. Its administrative center is the rural locality (a selo) of Kosikha. Population:  The population of the administrative center accounts for 29.2% of the district's total population.

References

Notes

Sources

Districts of Altai Krai